Ghada Mohammed Abdel Razek (born on 6 July 1970) is an Egyptian actress, she begun her career in 1997. She acted in many TV series and movies, and won many awards.

Early life
Abdel Razek was born in Kafr Saqr, Sharqia Governorate in 1970. She is the youngest of her two siblings. She has lived for six years in Yemen.

Career
She began her career as a model for advertisements. Her first acting role was in the TV series The thief I love in 1997. Her most famous TV roles were in Hajj Metwali's family in 2001, Mahmood Almasri in 2003, Sons of the night in 2007, Albateneya in 2009, Zahra and her five husbands in 2010, Samara in 2011, With premeditation in 2012, Life story in 2013, The First Lady in 2014, The Nightmare in 2015, Alkhanka in 2016, Land air in 2017, and Against unknown in 2018. 

She won the best actress award in Alexandria International Film Festival for her role in Hena maysara. She won the Murex d'Or award as best Egyptian actress in 2013. She also won the Dear Guest award from Dear Guest magazine as best actress in 2018. She also become a judge for the reality competition television show Arab Casting with Kosai Khauli and Carmen Lebbos.

Personal life
Ghada Abdel Razek was married and divorced multiple times. Her first marriage to Saudi businessman Adel Gazzaz took place when she was only seventeen years old; they divorced in 1994. Her second marriage was to a businessman from Port Said; they divorced shortly afterwards because of their age difference. Her third marriage was to Helmy Sarhan in 2001; they divorced one year later. Her fourth marriage was to producer Walid Al Tabaeyi; they divorced in 2009. Her fifth marriage was to journalist Mohamed Foda in 2011; they divorced in 2015. She has one daughter, Rotana Gazzaz, from her first husband, and she has two granddaughters. Ghada Abdel Razek is known as one of the biggest celebrities who support Egyptian president Abdel Fattah el-Sisi. On 7 May 2020, Abdel Razek announced that she married the cinematography director Haitham Zenita.

Works

TV series

Radio Series

Movies

Stage

TV Shows

References

External links
 Ghada Abdel Razek in IMDb

1970 births
Living people
20th-century Egyptian actresses
21st-century Egyptian actresses
Egyptian stage actresses
Egyptian film actresses
Egyptian television actresses
People from Sharqia Governorate
Egyptian Muslims